Hugo Colella (born 16 September 1999) is a French professional footballer who plays as a midfielder for  club Orléans.

Career statistics

Club

Notes

References

1999 births
French sportspeople of Italian descent
Footballers from Strasbourg
Living people
French footballers
Italian footballers
Association football midfielders
RC Strasbourg Alsace players
FC Metz players
SC Hessen Dreieich players
US Orléans players
FC Swift Hesperange players
R.E. Virton players
Berliner AK 07 players
Championnat National 3 players
Regionalliga players
Luxembourg National Division players
Challenger Pro League players
Championnat National players
French expatriate footballers
Italian expatriate footballers
French expatriate sportspeople in Germany
Italian expatriate sportspeople in Germany
Expatriate footballers in Germany
French expatriate sportspeople in Luxembourg
Italian expatriate sportspeople in Luxembourg
Expatriate footballers in Luxembourg
French expatriate sportspeople in Belgium
Italian expatriate sportspeople in Belgium
Expatriate footballers in Belgium